Members of the Legislative Assembly of Western Samoa were elected on 5 April 1991. The 47 members consisted of 45 Samoans elected in one or two-member constituency and two 'individual voters' elected from a nationwide constituency.

List of members

References

 1991